Events in the year 2021 in Bosnia and Herzegovina.

Incumbents
President: Milorad Dodik, Šefik Džaferović and Željko Komšić
Prime Minister: Zoran Tegeltija

Events
Ongoing – COVID-19 pandemic in Bosnia and Herzegovina

January
1 January – 2021 Tribistovo poisoning: Eight teenagers from the town of Posušje, aged between 18 and 19, died during New Year's Eve, the cause of death being suffocation from inhaling toxic gas, later reported as carbon monoxide poisoning. A national day of mourning was held on 2 January.

February
12 February – COVID-19 vaccination for the COVID-19 pandemic started in the entity of Republika Srpska, with the Russian Sputnik V vaccine used.
21 February – Municipal elections were repeated in the cities of Doboj and Srebrenica to elect mayors and assemblies.

March
2 March – Serbian president Aleksandar Vučić came to Sarajevo and donated 10,000 dozes of AstraZeneca COVID-19 vaccines for the COVID-19 pandemic.
10 March – COVID-19 vaccination for the COVID-19 pandemic started in the entity of the Federation of Bosnia and Herzegovina, with the AstraZeneca vaccine donated from Vučić used.
25 March – The first doses of the Pfizer–BioNTech COVID-19 vaccine, 24,300 of them, arrived through COVAX at the Sarajevo International Airport. The same day, 26,400 doses of the AstraZeneca COVID-19 vaccines arrived also through COVAX at the Sarajevo International Airport.

April
8 April – Benjamina Karić is elected to become the 39th Mayor of Sarajevo.

November
 4 November – 2021 floods in Bosnia and Herzegovina

Deaths

March
26 March – Želimir Altarac Čičak, rock promoter, poet, songwriter, music critic, and publicist (b. 1947).

April
8 April – Jovan Divjak, Bosnian army general (b. 1937).

June
3 June – Murat Šaran, Bosnian professional footballer (b. 1949).

September
3 September – Ljubo Bešlić, politician, mayor of Mostar (b. 1958).
5 September – Živko Radišić, politician, member and chairman of the Presidency (b. 1937).

November
7 November 2021 – Hasan Čengić, politician (b. 1957).

References

 
2020s in Bosnia and Herzegovina
Years of the 21st century in Bosnia and Herzegovina
Bosnia and Herzegovina
Bosnia and Herzegovina